The 2019–20 Gamma Ethniki was the 37th season since the official establishment of the championship in 1983, but the 1st season as the fourth tier of the Greek Football.
It will start on 22 September 2019. After the finish of the eight groups, the first team of each group will qualify for a playoff round of two groups, to determine which two teams will be promoted to Football League.

106 teams are divided into eight groups according to geographical criteria.

Only for Group 8 after the end of the regular season will be held play-off and play-out games. The top four teams will participate in the play-off round and the first team will be the champion of the group and will be qualifying to 2019–20 Gamma Ethniki play-offs second group. The last five teams will participate in play-out games and the last will be relegated.

Iraklis, Aiginiakos, Sparta, Alexandros Kilkis, Orestis Orestiada, Megas Alexandros Iasmos, and AOK Zakynthos withdrew from the league before the group draw.

Effects of the 2020 coronavirus pandemic 
On 29 April 2020 the HFF announced their decision to end the championship of Gamma Ethniki.
 The ranking on 8 March 2020 is the final ranking and every first team of each group will be champions.
 There will be future decision about the promotion/relegation.
 The promotion play-offs among the group champions will not be held.

Group 1

Teams

Standings

Group 2

Teams

Standings

Group 3

Teams

Standings

Group 4

Teams

Standings

Group 5

Teams

Standings

Group 6

Teams

Standings

Group 7

Teams

Standings

Group 8

Teams

Standings

Group 8 play-offs

Group 8 play-out

Promotion Playoffs 
 The promotion play-offs among the group champions will not be held.

References

Fourth level Greek football league seasons
4
Greece
Greece 4